The Berlin tennis exhibitions (known for sponsorship reasons as the bett1Aces) were two men's and women's exhibition tennis tournaments each, which were held from 13 to 19 July 2020 in Berlin, Germany, during the break of the ATP and WTA Tour due to the COVID-19 pandemic. From 13 to 15 July they took take place at the Steffi-Graf-Stadium on grass, and from 17 to 19 July in a disused hangar of the Airport Tempelhof on hardcourt. Six players each took part in the men's and women's competitions.

Dominic Thiem and Elina Svitolina were the champions of the tournaments at the Steffi-Graf-Stadium, before Thiem again and Anastasija Sevastova won at the Airport Tempelhof.

Participants 

Notes

Draws

Steffi-Graf-Stadium
13–15 July 2020 (on grass)

Men

Women

Note

Airport Tempelhof
17–19 July 2020 (on hardcourt)

Men

Note

Women

References

External links 
 

Exhibition tennis tournaments
Grass court tennis tournaments
Hard court tennis tournaments
July 2020 sports events in Germany
2020 in tennis
2020 in German tennis
Sports competitions in Berlin